Kinesin family member 16B, also known as KIF16B, is a protein which in humans is encoded by the KIF16B gene.

See also 

 Kinesin

References

Further reading

External links 
 PDBe-KB provides an overview of all the structure information available in the PDB for Human Kinesin-like protein KIF16B